Stephen Russell Mallory Jr. (November 2, 1848December 23, 1907) was a U.S. Senator and U.S. Representative from Florida who served as a Democrat. He was the son of U.S. Senator Stephen Russell Mallory.

He was born in Columbia, Richland County, South Carolina. During the American Civil War he entered the Confederate Army in the fall of 1864; appointed midshipman in the Confederate Navy in the spring of 1865 and served until the end of the war; graduated from Georgetown College, Washington, D.C., in 1869, where he then served as instructor in Latin and Greek until 1871; studied law; admitted to the bar in Louisiana in 1872 and commenced practice in New Orleans; moved to Pensacola, Florida, in 1874 and continued the practice of law; member, Florida House of Representatives 1876; member, Florida Senate 1880, and reelected in 1884; elected as a Democrat to the Fifty-second United States Congress and Fifty-third United States Congress (March 4, 1891 – March 3, 1895); was not a candidate for renomination in 1894; elected as a Democrat to the United States Senate in 1897, subsequently appointed and then elected to the Senate in 1903, and served from May 15, 1897, until his death in Pensacola, Florida, December 23, 1907; chairman, Committee on Corporations Organized in the District of Columbia (Sixtieth United States Congress); interment in St. Michael's Cemetery.

See also
List of United States Congress members who died in office (1900–49)

External links

Stephen Russell Mallory, late a senator from Florida, Memorial addresses delivered in the House of Representatives and Senate frontispiece 1909

1848 births
1907 deaths
19th-century American politicians
20th-century American politicians
Catholics from Florida
Catholics from South Carolina
Confederate States Army soldiers
Confederate States Navy officers
Democratic Party members of the United States House of Representatives from Florida
Democratic Party United States senators from Florida
Florida lawyers
Democratic Party Florida state senators
Georgetown College (Georgetown University) alumni
Louisiana lawyers
Democratic Party members of the Florida House of Representatives
People from Pensacola, Florida
People of South Carolina in the American Civil War
Philodemic Society members
Politicians from Columbia, South Carolina